The 1902 Northwestern Purple football team was an American football team that represented Northwestern University during the 1902 Western Conference football season. In its fourth season under head coach Charles M. Hollister, the team compiled a 6–6 record (0–4 against Western Conference opponents), won its first five-game before losing six of seven games, and finished in a tie for last place in the Western Conference.

Schedule

References

Northwestern
Northwestern Wildcats football seasons
Northwestern Purple football